Felsenstein may refer to:

Johannes Felsenstein (1944–2017), opera director
Joseph Felsenstein (born 1942), phylogeneticist
Felsenstein's tree pruning algorithm
Lee Felsenstein (born 1945), computer engineer
Walter Felsenstein (1901–1975), theater and opera director